The Tuya volcanic field is a volcanic field of tuyas located in far northern British Columbia, Canada, near the border with the Yukon Territory and focused on the area of the Tuya Range, a subrange of the Stikine Ranges of the Cassiar Mountains, though some vents are in the Kawdy Plateau, the northernmost part of the Stikine Plateau. Several small shield volcanoes, and postglacial lapilli cones and lava flows have been reported in this area. The only nonglacial volcanoes in the field are Gabrielse Cone and the West Tuya lava field.

Volcanoes
Volcanoes within the field include:

 Ash Mountain
 Blackfly Tuya
 Caribou Tuya
 Cottonwood Peak
 Gabrielse Cone
 Grizzly Butte
 Mount Josephine
 Klinkit Creek Peak
 Mathews Tuya
 Nome Lake South
 South Tuya
 Toozaza Peak
 Tuya Butte
 Volcano Vent
 West Vent

See also
 List of volcanoes in Canada
 Northern Cordilleran Volcanic Province
 Volcanism in Canada

References

 
 Volcano World

Volcanic fields of Canada
Tuyas of Canada
Northern Cordilleran Volcanic Province
Pleistocene volcanoes
Holocene volcanoes
Inactive volcanoes